Simon Roberts (12 December 1876 – 28 November 1908) was an Australian rules footballer who played with Carlton in the Victorian Football League (VFL).

Notes

External links 

Simon Roberts's profile at Blueseum

1876 births
Australian rules footballers from Melbourne
Carlton Football Club players
1908 deaths
People from Brunswick, Victoria